Daby Island is an island in Humboldt Bay in Humboldt County, California. Located east of Woodley Island, it is part of the city of Eureka and has an elevation of three feet.

There are 28 historic landmarks near the island.

References 

Islands of Northern California